Rhoe was a port town of ancient Bithynia in Asia Minor on the shore of the Pontus Euxinus. It was located 20 stadia east of Calpe, on a steep promontory and contained a road fit only for small vessels. It was inhabited during Roman and Byzantine Empire times.

Its site is located near Kefken in Asiatic Turkey.

References

Populated places in Bithynia
Former populated places in Turkey
History of Kocaeli Province
Roman towns and cities in Turkey
Populated places of the Byzantine Empire